The Wells River is a tributary of the Connecticut River, approximately  long, in the U.S. state of Vermont.

The Wells River begins at the outlet of Ricker Pond at the southern boundary of Groton State Forest in the town of Groton.  The river flows generally southeast through the towns of Ryegate and Newbury, reaching the Connecticut River at the village of Wells River.  U.S. Route 302 follows the river for most of its length.

See also
List of rivers of Vermont

References
 U.S. Geological Survey topographic maps, 1:100,000-scale series, Montpelier (VT) quadrangle
 

Rivers of Vermont
Tributaries of the Connecticut River
Bodies of water of Caledonia County, Vermont
Rivers of Orange County, Vermont